Gordon Ramsay's Ultimate Fit Food is a cookbook written by chef Gordon Ramsay, creator of Hell's Kitchen. The book is collection of food recipes for the purpose of cooking and eating.

The book has three sections namely ′Healthy′, ′Lean recipes′ and ′Fit′, each consisting of breakfasts, lunches, suppers, sides and snacks' recipes with health-boosting benefits explained.

See also
Recipe
Cookbook
Diet food
List of nutrition guides

References

Cookbooks
2018 non-fiction books
English cuisine